Silra Shahdadkot railway station is  located in Shahdadkot, Qambar Shahdadkot District, Pakistan.

References

External links

Railway stations in Qambar Shahdadkot District
Railway stations on Larkana–Jacobabad line